Government ministries of Syria make up the portfolios of the Cabinet of Syria.

Current ministries
 Ministry of Foreign Affairs and Expatriates
 former Ministry of Expatriates
 Ministry of Finance
 Ministry of Defense
 Ministry of Higher Education
 Ministry of Local Administration and Environment (Syria)
 Ministry of Tourism
 Ministry of Agriculture and Agrarian Reform
 Ministry of Education
 Ministry of Economy and Trade
 Ministry of Health
 Ministry of Justice
 Ministry of Awqaf (Syria)
 Ministry of Social Affairs and Labor (Syria)
 Ministry of Oil and Mineral Reserves (Syria)
 Ministry of Interior
 Ministry of Information
 Ministry of Culture
 Ministry of Electricity
 Ministry of Housing and Construction
 Ministry of Transport
 Ministry of Industry
 Ministry of Communications and Technology
Ministry of Water Resources
Ministry of Administrative Development
Ministry of Presidential Affairs
Ministry of State for Investment Affairs and Vital Projects
Ministry of State for People's Assembly Affairs
Ministry of State for Southern Development Affairs

Abolished ministries 

 Ministry of Irrigation (Syria)

See also
Council of Ministers (Syria)
List of prime ministers of Syria
Ministry of Foreign Affairs and Expatriates (Syria)

 
Government of Syria
Syria politics-related lists